Festis may refer to:
Festi, botnet
Festus (disambiguation)